Ternaard is a village in the municipality Noardeast-Fryslân located in the northeast of the province of Friesland between Dokkum and the Wadden Sea. It is the third most populous village in the municipality and had a population of 1,380 in January 2017.

History 
Between 819 and  825 Ternaard was first mentioned. It was called "Tununfurt" . Later also the names Tunawert, Thunewerd, Tonauwer, Tijnnawerdt, Tennaard were used. The words "Furt", "Wert" and "werdt" were synonyms for "wierde", a manmade hill. What Tunun means is unknown.

Ternaard previously belonged to the municipality Westdongeradeel. The mayor of the municipality lived in Ternaard. In the municipal reorganization of the province of Friesland (1984), the municipality Dongeradeel West merged with the municipality Oostdongeradeel and the city of Dokkum into the new Dongeradeel. In 2019 part of the new municipality Noardeast-Fryslân.

Services 
Ternaard offers a supermarket, butchers, a kindergarten, an elementary school, a health center, a homeopathic practice and a retirement home. There is also a bus service to Dokkum and Leeuwarden.

Sports 
Ternaard in sport has a billiard club, a football club, a tennis club a bounce, a bocce and volleyball.

Churches 
 The (late Gothic) Grote Kerk dates from the 16th century. This church has a fine 17th-century interior.
 Ternaard the Mennonite church has merged with the Mennonite church-Holwerd Blija in the new town-Holwerd Blija and Ternaard. In October 2007, the last service held in the Baptist church Ternaard. This church building has been sold.
 The Reformed Church in 1921 was designed by Ane Nauta.

Climate
Ternaard features an oceanic climate (Köppen Cfb).

References

External links

Noardeast-Fryslân
Populated places in Friesland